Adam Parfrey (April 12, 1957 – May 10, 2018) was an American journalist, editor, and the publisher of Feral House books, whose work in all three capacities frequently centered on unusual, extreme, or "forbidden" areas of knowledge. A 2010 Seattle Weekly profile stated that "what Parfrey does is publish books that explore the marginal aspects of culture. And in many cases—at least back when his interests were almost exclusively transgressive—he sheds light on subjects that society prefers to leave unexplored, carving a niche catering to those of us with an unseemly obsession with life's darkest, most depraved sides."

Early life
Parfrey was born in New York City, but during childhood moved to Los Angeles with his parents, actor Woodrow Parfrey and Rosa Ellovich, a stage director of Jewish descent. After graduating high school, he attended the University of California, Santa Cruz, and UCLA, before dropping out to move to San Francisco, where he began a short-lived experimental magazine, IDEA. That publication folded after two issues. In 1983 he wrote and performed in a play, The Wickedest Man in the World, about Gilles de Rais, a 15th-century French serial killer of children.

That year, Parfrey moved east to Hoboken, New Jersey, and began working at New York City's Strand Bookstore. In 1984, with Kim Seltzer and Strand co-worker George Petros, Parfrey launched EXIT magazine; he collaborated on three of the six published issues before leaving the publication in 1987.

Career

Amok Press
In 1987, Parfrey and Kenneth Swezey co-founded Amok Press in New York. (Amok Books, an unrelated imprint, was founded by Swezey's brother Stuart later that year.) Amok Press's first title was an English translation by Joachim Neugroschel of the Nazi propagandist Joseph Goebbels's novel Michael (1929). This was followed by Parfrey's Apocalypse Culture, a collection of articles, interviews, and documents that explore various marginal aspects of culture. In total, Amok Press published eight books, including You Can't Win, by Jack Black, The Grand Guignol: Theatre of Fear and Terror, by Mel Gordon, and Boxcar Bertha: An Autobiography, As Told to Dr. Ben L. Reitman.

Feral House
Parfrey moved back to the west coast and while living in Portland, Oregon, founded another imprint, Feral House, in 1989. Over the years, Feral House published titles by Steven Blush, Joseph P. Farrell, Phillip Thomas Tucker, John Zerzan, Alain Saury, Jennifer Robin, John Sinclair, Anton LaVey, Michael Moynihan, Didrik Søderlind and others, as well as many titles Parfrey himself wrote or edited.

In 2000, Apocalypse Culture II, a sequel to the 1987 book, was published. 
In 2005, Parfrey co-founded the publishing company Process Media with Jodi Wille of Dilettante Press.

Vice Magazine called Adam Parfrey a forerunner to 4chan and Reddit.

Personal life
Parfrey left Portland and lived in Los Angeles for a time before decamping permanently to Port Townsend, Washington, where he resided for the remainder of his life.

Death
He died in Seattle on May 10, 2018, following complications from a series of strokes.

Awards
 Winner: Independent Publisher Awards Best History Book of 2012 Silver Medal: Ritual America: Secret Brotherhoods and Their Influence on America Society, by Adam Parfrey and Craig Heimbichner.

Works

Books
 Apocalypse Culture edited by Adam Parfrey (Amok Press, 1988)
 Rants and Incendiary Tracts edited by Bob Black and Adam Parfrey (Amok Press, 1988)
 The Manson File compiled by Adam Parfrey, credited to Nikolas Schreck (Amok Press, 1988)
 Apocalypse Culture: Revised and Expanded edited by Adam Parfrey (Amok Press, 1990)
 Nightmare of Ecstasy: The Life and Art of Edward D. Wood, Jr. by Rudolph Grey, edited by Parfrey (Feral House, 1994)
 Cult Rapture: Revelations of the Apocalyptic Mind by Adam Parfrey (Feral House, 1995)
 End Is Near!: Visions of Apocalypse, Millennium and Utopia by Stephen Jay Gould, Roger Manley, Adam Parfrey and Dalai Lama, foreword by Rebecca Hoffberger (Dilettante Press, 1998, paperback , 1999, hardcover )
 Muerte!: Death in Mexican Popular Culture by Harvey Stafford, edited by Adam Parfrey, illustrated by J. G. Posada, photographs by the ¡Alarma! Staff (Feral House, 2000)
 Apocalypse Culture II edited by Adam Parfrey (Feral House, 2000)
 Extreme Islam: Anti-American Propaganda of Muslim Fundamentalism edited by Adam Parfrey, introduction by Tamim Ansary (Feral House, 2002)
 Lexicon Devil: The Fast Times and Short Life of Darby Crash and the Germs by Brendan Mullen, Adam Parfrey and Don Bolles (Feral House, 2002)
 It's a Man's World: Men's Adventure Magazines – the Postwar Pulps edited by Adam Parfrey, material by Josh Alan Friedman, Mort Künstler, David Saunders and Bill Devine (Feral House, 2003)
 War Is a Racket: The Anti-War Classic by America's Most Decorated General by Smedley D. Butler, with introduction by Adam Parfrey (reprinted in 2003 by Feral House)
 Two Thousand Formulas, Recipes, and Trade Secrets: The Classic Do-It-Yourself Book of Practical Everyday Chemistry by Harry Bennett and Adam Parfrey (Feral House, 2003)
 Sin-a-Rama: Sleaze Sex Paperbacks of the Sixties by B. Astrid Daley, Adam Parfrey and Lydia Lunch (Feral House, 2004)
 Secret Source: The Law of Attraction and Its Hermetic Influence Throughout the Ages by Maja D'Aoust, Adam Parfrey and Jodi Wille (Feral House, 2007)
 Love, Sex, Fear, Death: The Inside Story of the Process Church of Final Judgment by Timothy Wyllie, edited by Adam Parfrey (Feral House, 2009)
 Feral Man in a Feral Land: Strange Tales from the Apocalypse Culture by Adam Parfrey (Feral House, 2010)
 Ritual America: Secret Brotherhoods and Their Influence on American Society: A Visual Guide by Adam Parfrey and Craig Heinbichner (Feral House, 2012)
 Citizen Keane: The Big Lies Behind the Big Eyes by Adam Parfrey and Cletus Nelson (Feral House, 2014)
 Propaganda and the Holy Writ of the Process Church of the Final Judgement: Sex Issue, Fear Issue, Death Issue, The Gods on War by Timothy Wyllie and Adam Parfrey (Feral House, 2015)

Articles
 Parfrey wrote cover stories and feature articles for the Village Voice, San Diego Reader, Penthouse, and Hustler magazines.
 Between 1990 and 1994 Parfrey wrote the weekly column "HelL.A." for the San Diego Reader.

Recordings
 S.W.A.T. – Deep Inside a Cop's Mind: The Soundtrack for the Next Police State (Audio CD, 1994, Label: Amphetamine Reptile Records).
 A Sordid Evening of Sonic Sorrows (Audio CD, 1997, Man's Ruin Records MR-066).
 He has also collaborated with Boyd Rice on his album Hatesville.
 Plays the voice of Lord Jehova in the reading of The Gods on War with Genesis Breyer P-Orridge (The Lord Lucifer), Lydia Lunch (The Lord Satan) and Timothy Wyllie (Transcendence).

References

Further reading
"Father of Apocalypse Culture: An Interview with Adam Parfrey", in Chad Hensley's (ed.) Esoterra: The Journal of Extreme Culture. Creation Books, 2011, pp. 15–17. The interview is followed by an article by Parfrey entitled "Weird Sex Cults" (pp 18–21).

External links

 adam parfrey at Disinformation
 Feral House's website
 Adam Parfrey biography
 Salon.com profile of Adam Parfrey
 

1957 births
2018 deaths
American male journalists
Journalists from New York City
Writers from New York City
Writers from Port Townsend, Washington
University of California, Santa Cruz alumni
American publishers (people)
American people of Jewish descent